The Portuguese Wikipedia is the Portuguese language edition of Wikipedia (written Wikipédia, in Portuguese), the free encyclopedia. It was started on 11 May 2001. In addition to being the sixth most accessed website in the world, Wikipedia is the fifteenth most accessed website in Brazil and the sixth most accessed in Portugal. , it is the  largest Wikipedia by article count, containing  articles.

History 

The Portuguese Wikipedia was the third edition of Wikipedia to be created, simultaneously with other languages. It started its activities on May 11, 2001, having reached the mark of one hundred thousand articles on January 26, 2006.

From late 2004, the edition grew rapidly. In May 2005, it overtook both the Spanish and Italian language Wikipedias. By comparison, in May 2004 it was only the 17th Wikipedia by the number of articles.

Portuguese articles can contain variations of writing, as European Portuguese and Brazilian Portuguese have differences in vocabulary and usage. Articles can contain written characteristics of one or the other variant depending on who wrote the article.

The Portuguese Wikipedia community decided not to split a separate Brazilian Portuguese version off from the Portuguese Wikipedia. In 2005, a proposal to fork Portuguese Wikipedia and create a Brazilian Portuguese (pt-br) version was voted down by the Wikimedia community. In 2007 another one to create European Portuguese was rejected too by the Wikimedia community. In 2009 another one to create in Brazilian Portuguese was rejected, but this time by language committee, according to new policies to create new Wikipedia editions, with the following explanation: "Brazilian Portuguese is not a separate language.. this is a requirement."

Beginning in January 2007, the project experienced a decrease of the share of edits by unregistered users (from around 20 to around 15%) and an increase of the share of such edits being reverted, from about 15% to a peak of 25% in late 2008, which suggests an increase in disruptive editing.
In the same month, a JavaScript was added that forced all unregistered users to preview their edit before saving it.

In December 2010, the Portuguese Wikipedia overtook the Dutch language Wikipedia in a number of articles, but in the first quarter of 2011, it was surpassed by the Russian and Dutch language Wikipedias, ranking in the tenth position.

In April 2016, the project had 1388 active editors who made at least five edits in that month.

Characteristics 

The Portuguese language Wikipedia is different from the English one in a number of aspects.
 Fair use images were forbidden until 2009. Debates have been raised before concerning the fair use policy, all of them failing to have the uploading of such images allowed. Uploading pictures at the Portuguese Wikipedia has even been fully disabled until then. In August 2009, though, a new debate was raised in order for users to approve or deny the creation of a policy of uploading fair use media (named "Uso Restrito de Conteúdo" there, which translates as Restricted Use of Contents). This debate resulted in 142 votes for "yes" against 120 votes for "no", which means the policy was approved and implemented.
 Like English, Portuguese has regional differences in vocabulary, grammar, and spelling. It is widely accepted that an article written in Brazilian Portuguese should be kept as it is, and the same applies to articles in European Portuguese. However, if one rewrites the article in another variant (provided content was changed, not merely the language), but leaves some words in the former variant, these words should be rewritten in accordance with the new version's variant of the article.
 In order to hinder SPAM and trolling, completion of a CAPTCHA image was required for all unregistered users to make any edit. It was disabled on January 1, 2014.
 In 2020, after a community vote that lasted from September 4 to October 4, the Portuguese Wikipedia no longer allows edits from unregistered users (IP addresses).

As of 2019, the Portuguese Wikipedia had 316,000 unique categories, 3.57% of them lacking an appropriate page in the category namespace. The average article in this language version has 9 categories, while the ratio of unique categories per article is 0.314. The largest number of articles belong to Arts (16%) and Geography (14%) categories. Articles related to Crime and Events have the highest average quality. Those related to Health are read more often, and articles in the Business category have the highest average author interest.

References 
 Lih, Andrew. The Wikipedia Revolution: How a Bunch of Nobodies Created the World's Greatest Encyclopedia. Hyperion, New York City. 2009. First Edition.  (alkaline paper).

Notes

External links 

  Portuguese Wikipedia
  Portuguese Wikipedia mobile version
 

Wikipedias by language
Internet properties established in 2001
Portuguese-language encyclopedias
Wikipedia
Wikipedias in Romance languages